Shuja is a surname and male given name. 

Notable people with this name include:
 Shuja al-Khwarazmi, was the mother of Abbasid caliph Al-Mutawakkil (r. 847–861)
 Ahmad Shuja Pasha (born 1952), Pakistani general
 Badruddoza Ahmed Shuja, Bangladeshi politician
 Hakim Ahmad Shuja (1893–1969)
 Kashif Shuja (born 1979), Pakistani squash player
 Mian Mujtaba Shuja-ur-Rehman, Pakistani politician
 Shah Shuja (Mughal prince) (1616–1661)
 Shah Shujah Durrani (1785–1842)
 Shakir Shuja Abadi
 Shuja Haider, Pakistani musician
 Shuja Haider (cricketer) (born 1994), Pakistani cricket player
 Shuja Khanzada (1943–2015), Pakistani politician and colonel
 Shuja ud-Din (born 1913), Afghan field hockey player
 Shuja ul Mulk, Pakistani politician
 Shuja ul-Mulk (1881–1936)
 Shuja ul-Mulk Jalala (born 1952), Afghan politician
 Shuja-ud-Daula (1732-1775)
 Shuja-ud-Din Muhammad Khan
 Shuja-ul-Mulk, Pakistani politician
 Usman Shuja, American cricket player
 Shuja Noori, Afghan Activist